General elections were held in Ghana on Friday 7 December 2012 to elect a president and members of Parliament in 275 electoral constituencies. Owing to the breakdown of some biometric verification machines, some voters could not vote, and voting was extended to Saturday 8 December 2012. A run-off was scheduled for 28 December 2012 if no presidential candidate received an absolute majority of 50% plus one vote. Competing for presidency were incumbent president John Dramani Mahama of the National Democratic Congress (NDC), his main challenger Nana Akufo-Addo of the New Patriotic Party (NPP) and six other candidates.

Incumbent president John Mahama was declared winner of the presidential contest with 50.7% of the vote, just a few thousand votes over the threshold for avoiding a run-off election. Nana Akufo-Addo received 47.74%. The opposition alleged tampering with results by the Electoral Commission (EC), and filed a petition at the Ghanaian Supreme Court to review the election results. The NPP produced more than 11,000 so-called "pink sheets" to the judges who had to compare them to similar papers from the EC, NDC and possibly other parties. These pink sheets state the results as counted in single polling stations, before aggregating them to any higher level, such as municipality, district and region. The NPP claimed that there were differences between the results as stated immediately after their counting in polling stations, and those which were used in aggregations, and that this can be proven by the pink sheets. In a separate part of the procedure, the EC was challenged to prove that 14,000 expat Ghanaians had voted abroad, and failed to produce any registered voters in foreign countries due to, so EC, the fatal work of a virus in its computer. The election petition led to great changes in the electoral system that helped ensure a high level of transparency in the voting system and collation of the results. 

Mahama was elected to a full term less than five months as president having succeeded John Atta Mills, who died suddenly in office in July 2012.

Preparations

Biometric voters registration
The Electoral Commission of Ghana successfully held a biometric system of registration for the electorate from 24 March 2012 to 5 May 2012. The move was aimed to prevent double registration and to eliminate ghost names in the old register.

Electoral demarcations
Controversially, 45 additional constituencies were added to the 230 of the 2008 general election. Voting therefore took place in a total of 275 constituencies and 26002 polling stations.

Monitoring
The Coalition of Domestic Election Observers (CODEO) trained election observers and deployed 4000 of them to monitor the elections nationwide.

Observers from ECOWAS Observer Mission led by former Nigerian president, General Olusegun Obasanjo also monitored the elections. The mission noted the technical glitches caused by faulty biometric machines but added that it had not undermined the fairness and transparency of the election.

Pre-election controversy
There have been accusations against the media for not covering the election in a fair manner after a media have projected that the main opposition.

Following the death of incumbent President John Atta Mills amid concerns for the election, leader of the Electoral Commission of Ghana Kwadwo Afari-Gyan said that "the election calendar remains unchanged—it's purely a party matter" and the National Democratic Congress had to decide whom to nominate as its new candidate.

The main talking point following the close of nominations was the disqualification of Nana Konadu Agyeman Rawlings, leader of the newly formed National Democratic Party. This was due to errors in the documentation presented to the Electoral Commission.

Presidential candidates
Eight candidates were on the ballot.

Running mates
The following eight candidates have been approved by their parties and the Electoral Commission of Ghana as running mates of the above listed presidential candidates for the election on 7 December 2012.

Results

President

Parliament

Reaction

The non-partisan Coalition of Domestic Election Observers (CODEO), the Economic Community of West African States (ECOWAS) and the African Union (AU) all declared that the elections were, for the most part, free and fair. Despite this, there were still widespread allegations of voting irregularities, though these were dismissed as unsubstantiated by the electoral commission chairman.  As a result of these claims, the New Patriotic Party immediately rejected the results upon their release and its candidate, Nana Akufo-Addo, remarked that his party's leaders would be meeting on 11 December to consider their options, one of which is to contest the results by lodging an appeal in court. Violent opposition was however ruled out.

African Union commission chairman Thomas Yayi flew to Ghana to meet with the two men. He was also reported to have congratulated Mahama on his victory, and charged him to preside over an all-inclusive government. Yayi praised the conduct and the participants of the election.

In anticipation of petitions regarding the election, Chief Justice Georgina Theodora Wood has established two public complaints secretariats to swiftly process such concerns.

In a statement after being declared the victor, Mahama gave a reconciliatory message, saying  "I wish to welcome my fellow candidates to join me now as partners in the project of nation building and of creating a better Ghana".

Image gallery

See also 
List of MPs elected in the 2012 Ghanaian parliamentary election

References

External links
GHANA PRESIDENTIAL AND PARLIAMENTARY ELECTIONS 7 December 2012 (Commonwealth Secretariat)

Elections in Ghana
2012 elections in Africa
2012 in Ghana
2012
December 2012 events in Africa